Yung-jan Chan and Chia-jung Chuang were the defending champions, but lost in the quarterfinals to Andreea Ehritt-Vanc and Tamarine Tanasugarn.

Marina Erakovic and Michaëlla Krajicek won in the final 6–3, 6–2, against Līga Dekmeijere and Angelique Kerber.

Seeds
The top seeds receive a bye into the second round.

Draw

Draw

External links
Draw

Women's Doubles
Ordina Open